Al-Mutamar is a daily newspaper issued by the Iraqi National Congress.  There has been some controversy after it was discovered that the United States was secretly paying Iraqi newspapers, including Al-Mutamar, to print possibly biased articles written by American troops and officials.

See also
List of newspapers in Iraq

References

External links
 Official website 

Newspapers published in Iraq